C-type lectin domain family 1 member B is a protein that in humans is encoded by the CLEC1B gene.

Natural killer (NK) cells express multiple calcium-dependent (C-type) lectin-like receptors, such as CD94 (KLRD1; MIM 602894) and NKG2D (KLRC4; MIM 602893), that interact with major histocompatibility complex class I molecules and either inhibit or activate cytotoxicity and cytokine secretion. CLEC2 is a C-type lectin-like receptor expressed in myeloid cells and NK cells.[supplied by OMIM]

References

External links

Further reading

Genes on human chromosome 12
C-type lectins